Emma Smith (1804–1879) was the official wife of Joseph Smith and the first president of the Relief Society.

Emma Smith may also refer to:
Emma Smith (artist) (1783–1853), English artist
Emma Smith (author) (1923–2018), English novelist
Emma Smith (gymnast) (born 1991), British trampoline gymnast
Emma Elizabeth Smith (c. 1843–1888), prostitute and murder victim in London
Emma Smith (scholar), lecturer in English at the University of Oxford

See also